Pha Sadet railway station is a railway station in the area of Thap Kwang Subdistrict, Kaeng Khoi District, Saraburi Province, Thailand.

History
Pha Sadet railway station is a historic place, since it is the first railway line in Thailand, the northeastern railway line that has been built since 1892 and was completed in 1900 with a distance from Bangkok to Korat (Nakhon Ratchasima).

Pha Sadet is a distinctive cliff with an overhanging rock to the tracks lied  southwestern of the station. It is the place where King Chulalongkorn (Rama V) and Queen Saovabha Phongsri came when the King opened the Bangkok-Nakhon Ratchasima railway line in 1895 and inscribed the King's Thai monogram on this cliff, "Chor Por Ror" (จ.ป.ร.). Hence the name "Pha Sadet", which means "the cliff visited by king".

The location of the cliff and the station can be considered as the entrance to the Khao Yai grand jungle, where it is referred to as "Dong Phaya Yen" (formerly known as "Dong Phaya Fai").

Train services
 Rapid No. 135/136 Bangkok-Ubon Ratchathani-Bangkok
 Ordinary No. 233/234 Bangkok-Surin-Bangkok
 Local No. 431/432 Kaeng Khoi Junction-Khon Kaen-Kaeng Khoi Junction

References

Railway stations in Thailand